The  or  is the second tallest building in Osaka and the third tallest building in Japan. It is located in Nanko Cosmo Square, near the Osaka harbor, in Suminoe-ku.

The skyscraper rises , the same height as the Rinku Gate Tower Building in Izumisano. It contains three basement floors, a museum, restaurants, office space, a conference room, a skylobby and an observation deck, which is located in an inverted pyramid at the top of the structure. The building houses the working office for the governor of Osaka Prefecture.

See also
List of tallest structures in Osaka Prefecture
List of tallest structures in Japan

References

External links

  
 IBPC Osaka

Tourist attractions in Osaka
Skyscrapers in Osaka
Osaka
Government buildings completed in 1995
Skyscraper office buildings in Japan
1995 establishments in Japan